Musa Javed Chohan (b. 30 May 1948 in Pind Dadan Khan, Pakistan) is the former High Commissioner of Pakistan to Canada, as well as the former ambassador of Pakistan to France and Pakistan's permanent representative to UNESCO from 2001 to 2003.

He has previously served as High Commissioner of Pakistan to Malaysia. In view of his efforts to further improve relations between France and Pakistan, he was awarded the Ordre National du Mérite for which he is a Commandeur.

Education 
Ambassador Chohan holds four master's degrees: International Relations & Diplomacy; History; English Literature; and Defence and Strategic Studies.  He is conversant in English, French, Urdu and Punjabi languages. He is an alumnus of Government College, Lahore and the Fletcher School of Law and Diplomacy.

Career 

Ambassador Chohan has served as Pakistan's Ambassador Plenipotentiary and Extraordinary to France (2001–2003) and as High Commissioner to Malaysia (1997–2001). He was also Pakistan's Permanent Representative to UNESCO (2001–2003). Earlier, his assignments have included postings in the Pakistan Missions at Tehran, Guinea, Glasgow and Paris. He also served in Pakistan's Permanent Mission to the United Nations at New York.

In 1971 he started as an officer of the Foreign Service of Pakistan, he has also worked on various posts at the Ministry of Foreign Affairs, Islamabad. These included assignments like Special Secretary Foreign Affairs (2003–2004), Director General (South Asia), Director General (Americas), Director General (Foreign Minister's Office), Director (Foreign Secretary's Office) and Director (Afghanistan). He was also a participant of the Senior Officers' Course at Pakistan's National Defence College in 1995–1996. Ambassador Chohan has participated in several conferences, seminars, symposia and meetings of the international and regional organisations, including the 40th, 41st and 42nd sessions of the UN General Assembly, UNESCO Executive Council and General Conference, UNFPA, UNDP, NAM, and the summits and Foreign Ministers' meetings of the Organisation of Islamic Conference (OIC) and the Economic Cooperation Organization (ECO). Between 2004 and 2006, he oversaw the training of new entrants to the Foreign Service of Pakistan in his capacity as Director General, Foreign Service Academy at Islamabad, Pakistan.

Literary works 
Ambassador Chohan authored Ghungroo (2017), a fictional biographic novel set in 20th century Lahore, and published a collection of his poems entitled Barricaded Self, (2007).

Family 

He is married to Ambassador Naela Chohan, and has three children: Omar Javed Chohan, Usman W. Chohan, and Ibrahim Abubakr Chohan.

References

External links
 Determinants of Peace in South Asia - Ambassador Musa Javed Chohan The University of Queensland South Asia Symposium (English)
 Pakistan's Envoy takes aim at Dion Afghanistan News Center. January 2008.
 Pakistan wants Taliban Negotiations started Interview with Musa Javed Chohan, Embassy Magazine. October 2008.
 Foreign Affairs trying to go Multicultural "Pakistani power couple High Commissioner Musa Javed Chohan and his wife, deputy head of mission Naela Chohan". May 2008.
 The Blame Game on Afghanistan is not Constructive Embassy Magazine. January 2008.
  Canada Practicing Diplomacy on Afghanistan's Border Afghanistan News Center. June 2008.
 Canada-Pakistan Relations through the Afghan Prism Ambassador's Roundtable Conference, Carleton University
 Ottawa Citizen Interview Interview defending Pakistan's role in Afghanistan
 Great potential to boost economic ties between Pakistan and Canada Business Recorder Interview
 Pakistan Wants Taliban Negotiations Started Embassy Magazine Interview
 International Herald Tribune Letter to the Editor
  Embassy Magazine Sexy and Savvy Survey
 Taliban Threats Backfire Diplomatic Article
 Pakistan's Well-Being Critical to Afghanistan Embassy Magazine Interview

1948 births
Living people
High Commissioners of Pakistan to Canada
High Commissioners of Pakistan to Malaysia
Ambassadors of Pakistan to France
Government College University, Lahore alumni
The Fletcher School at Tufts University alumni
Permanent Delegates of Pakistan to UNESCO